The Syosset Central School District serves the inhabitants of Syosset, a suburb in Nassau County, New York, on Long Island. It also serves the suburbs of Woodbury, and parts of Plainview, Jericho, Laurel Hollow, Muttontown, Oyster Bay Cove, Hicksville, and East Norwich. The Syosset Central School District operates ten schools.

Schools

High schools
 Syosset High School70 South Woods RoadSyosset, NY 11791

Middle schools
 Harry B. Thompson Middle School98 Ann DriveSyosset, NY 11791
 South Woods Middle School99 Pell LaneSyosset, NY 11791

Elementary schools
 AP Willits Elementary School99 Nana PlaceSyosset, NY 11791
 Berry Hill Elementary School181 Cold Spring RoadSyosset, NY 11791
 J. Irving Baylis Elementary School580 Woodbury RoadPlainview, NY 11803
 Robbins Lane Elementary School157 Robbins LaneSyosset, NY 11791
 South Grove Elementary School60 Colony LaneSyosset, NY 11791
 Village Elementary School90 Convent RoadSyosset, NY 11791
 Walt Whitman Elementary School482 Woodbury RoadWoodbury, NY 11797

Academic Performance
The Syosset Central School District is consistently ranked among the top performing school districts in the United States. As of the 2018-19 school year, Syosset CSD was ranked 4th in New York by Niche. In this school district, 82% of students are considered proficient in Reading and Writing, and 89% are considered proficient in Mathematics.

Board of Education
For the 2019-2020 school year, the Board of Education includes:
 Tracy Frankel, President
 Rob Gershon, Vice President
 Carol C. Cheng, Trustee
 Christopher Di Filippo, Trustee
 Andrew Feldman, Trustee
 Anna Levitan, Trustee
 Susan Parker, Trustee
 Thomas A. Rotolo, Trustee
 Chris Ulrich, Trustee

Early Regents Exams
In most schools throughout NY state, the NYS Regents Exam for Algebra 1 is administered in 9th grade. However, this test is administered in 8th grade for students in Syosset and some other districts in NY State. This practice gives pupils more time to study for the SATs and prepare for college.

Awards and recognition
 1992-1993: Syosset High School recognized as a U.S. Department of Education Blue Ribbon School of Excellence. 
 1996-1997: Harry B. Thompson Middle School recognized as a Blue Ribbon School of Excellence. 
 1999-2000: South Woods Middle School recognized as a Blue Ribbon School of Excellence. 
 2002: School district named winner of the Kennedy Center Alliance for Arts Education Network and National School Boards Association Award for excellence in arts education.
 2004: Syosset High School named a Grammy Signature for its music programs in orchestra, band and chorus.
 2006: Village Elementary School recognized as a No Child Left Behind - Blue Ribbon School by the U.S. Department of Education.
 2008: New York State History Day Contest winners: Third place, Junior Group Performance; First place, Senior Historical Paper
 2009: Two semifinalists in the Regeneron Science Talent Search
 2019: Syosset CSD was ranked 4th in New York by Niche.

General Information
6386 students were enrolled in Syosset schools for the 2014-2015 school year. The district specializes in the arts with well recognized programs in art, voice, cooking, dance, theatre, band, orchestra, and photography. Syosset schools participate in county and state programs for voice and art..

The Syosset Central School District has an intensive mandatory foreign language program with kindergarten Russian, 1st grade Chinese, grade 2-4 Italian, Spanish, or French, and grade 5 Latin. In middle school (grades 6-8) students choose from Spanish, Italian, French or Chinese. In high school (grades 9-12) students stick with their first language (Italian, French, or Spanish) and can take an additional language, including Japanese, Chinese, Russian, or American Sign Language.

First Lady Hillary Clinton visited Village Elementary School in 1999.

References

External links
 

Syosset, New York
School districts in New York (state)
Education in Nassau County, New York